Hirzkar Lake is a group of small lakes in Upper Austria. In the past there were more lakes, but many have since dried up. A hiking trail connects the lake area to Krippeneck and a cable car at Gjaidstein.

References 

Hirzkar